The Dialectic of Sex: The Case for Feminist Revolution is a 1970 book by the radical feminist activist Shulamith Firestone. Written over a few months when Firestone was 25, it has been described as a classic of feminist thought.

Firestone argues that the "sexual class system" predates and runs deeper than any other form of oppression, and that the eradication of sexism will require a radical reordering of society: "The first women are fleeing the massacre, and, shaking and tottering, are beginning to find each other. ... This is painful: no matter how many levels of consciousness one reaches, the problem always goes deeper. It is everywhere. ... feminists have to question, not just all of Western culture, but the organization of culture itself, and further, even the very organization of nature."

The goal of the feminist revolution, she wrote, must be "not just the elimination of male privilege but of the sex distinction itself" so that genital differences no longer have cultural significance.

Summary

Firestone's theories have been described by philosophy professor Mary Anne Warren as follows: Firestone argues that the biological sexual dichotomy, particularly the biological division of labor in reproduction, is the root cause of male domination, economic class exploitation, racism, imperialism and ecological irresponsibility. Sexual inequality is "an oppression that goes back beyond recorded history to the animal kingdom itself": in this sense, it has been universal and inevitable, but the cultural and technological preconditions now exist that make its elimination possible and perhaps necessary for human survival.

Firestone describes her approach as a dialectical materialism more radical than that of Karl Marx and Friedrich Engels. She believes that in their preoccupation with economic processes, Marx and Engels failed to perceive "the sexual substratum of the historical dialectic". Unlike Engels, she maintains that male domination is biologically based and as such existed long before the institution of private property and the monogamous patriarchal family which private property produced. Male domination is the result of the "biological family", whether matrilineal or patrilineal, and the inevitable dependence of women and children within the family upon men, for protection if not subsistence. There were no ancient matriarchies (societies ruled by women), and the apparently superior status of women in matrilineal cultures is due only to the relative weakness of men. Whatever the lineage system, women's vulnerability during pregnancy and the long period of human infancy necessitate the protective and hence dominant role of the male.

This dependence of the female and the child on the male causes "psychosexual distortions in the human personality", distortions that were described by Sigmund Freud. Firestone describes Freudianism as a "misguided feminism", since she sees the only real difference between Freud's analysis and that of the radical feminists as being that Freud and his followers accept the social context in which sexual repression develops as immutable. Freud demonstrated that the source of repression and sex-class distinctions is the inherently unequal power relationship in the biological family: women and children are alike oppressed by the more powerful father. The young boy identifies first with the mother, whose oppression he shares, but soon switches his identification to the father, whose power he fears but will someday inherit. In the process he accedes to the incest taboo and the strict separation of sexuality and emotion which this requires, and which is the psychological foundation of political and ideological oppression. While the young girl also envies the father's power, she learns that she cannot inherit it and can only share in it indirectly, by currying favor with the dominant male.

Not only are women and children both inevitably oppressed in the biological family, they are doubly oppressed by the particular form of it which prevails in the industrialized nations: the patriarchal nuclear family, which isolates each couple and their offspring. Compulsory schooling and the romantic mythology of childhood are devices which serve to prolong the isolation of children and their economic dependence. The socialist-feminist revolution will free both women and children, leaving them with complete economic independence and sexual freedom, and integrating them fully into the larger world. The end of the sex-class system must mean the end of the biological family, that is, the end of women's biological reproductive role through artificial means of gestation. Love between the sexes will remain, for it becomes oppressive only when joined to the reproductive function. The biological family turns sexual love into a tool of oppression. Within it, women give their love to men, thus inspiring the latter to greater cultural creativity, and providing the former with an emotional identity of the sort denied them in the larger world. Yet men, as a result of the Oedipus complex and the incest taboo, are unable to love: they must degrade the women they make love to, in order to distinguish them from the mother, the first and forbidden love object. They cannot simultaneously respect and be sexually attracted to women.

This is why the "sexual revolution" has not meant liberation for women, who are still bound by the double standard and the need to combine love and sexuality. By eliminating the biological family and the incest taboo, the feminist revolution will enlarge the opportunity for real heterosexual love, as well as legitimating every other type of voluntary sexual relationship. Firestone hesitates to make exact predictions about how children will be raised once they are no longer born of women in the biological family, but suggests that there will be a variety of child-rearing social units, including couples "living together" and households of unrelated persons, up to a dozen or so, who contract to remain together long enough to provide a home for their children until the latter are ready to enter the world, which they will do at a much earlier age than is now considered possible.

The feminist revolution presupposes socialism, but goes beyond it. Existing socialist societies have tried to expand women's roles without fundamentally altering them, to integrate women into a male world, rather than eliminating sex class altogether. The feminist revolution will end the split between the "Aesthetic Mode" (feminine, intuitive, and artistic) and the "Technological Mode" (masculine, empirical, and aimed at the control of nature through the comprehension of its mechanical laws). The end of sexual repression will free Eros to diffuse throughout and humanize the entire culture. Eventually it will lead not only to the end of alienated labor but of labor as such, defined as activity which is not performed for its own sake. Technology will eliminate domestic and other drudgery, leaving everyone free to do work which is intrinsically rewarding.

Reception
The Dialectic of Sex is a feminist classic. Mary Anne Warren described it in 1980 as "the clearest and boldest presentation thus far of the radical feminist position". In 1998 Arthur Marwick ranked it as one of radical feminism's two key texts, along with Kate Millett's Sexual Politics (1969). Writing in The Cambridge Companion to Marx (1991), Jeff Hearn described Firestone's approach as having lasting significance in reviving interest in sexuality and reproduction as the basis of patriarchy.

The American journalist Susan Faludi wrote in 2013 that, although criticized for their radicalism, the basic tenets of The Dialectic of Sex have been of lasting significance. Firestone imagined reproduction outside the womb, and children being raised by collectives and granted the right to leave abusive situations. "Predictably," Faludi wrote, "the proposal[s] stimulated more outrage than fresh thought, though many of Firestone's ideas—children's rights, an end to 'male' work and traditional marriage, and social relations altered through a 'cybernetic' computer revolution—have proved prescient."

Juliet Mitchell argued that Firestone misreads Freud, and misunderstands the implications of psychoanalytic theory for feminism. She noted that while Firestone, like Simone de Beauvoir, attributes the term "Electra complex" to Freud, it was actually coined by Carl Jung. Mitchell suggested that for Firestone, the only kind of reality is social actuality (the generic experience or accidental experience of the individual), and that in this respect Firestone's work closely resembles that of Wilhelm Reich. In Mitchell's view, Firestone's interpretation of Freud reduces his psychological constructs to the social realities from which they were reduced, thereby equating the Oedipus complex with the nuclear family. Firestone thus interprets Freudian "metaphors" such as the Oedipus complex in terms of power relations within the family, an approach Mitchell considered mistaken.

In her introduction to the 1998 edition of the book, Rosalind Delmar argued that Firestone's "counter-explanation of problems observed by Freud relies too heavily on recourse to rationalizations", and neglect the inner world of fantasy. In Delmar's view, the result of Firestone's discussion of Freud is that "Freud is not so much refuted or rescued from his mistakes as ignored." Mary O'Brien, in her The Politics of Reproduction (1981), criticized Firestone's work for reductionism, biologism, historical inaccuracy, and general crudity.

Writing in The Evolution of Human Sexuality (1979), the anthropologist Donald Symons attributed to Firestone the view that, although the sexes are identical at birth, men are emotionally crippled by early experiences that women escape, and that men, unlike women, are therefore unable to love. Symons contrasted Firestone's views with his own view that "selection has produced marked sex differences in sexuality" and that neither sex is a defective version of the other.

In an interview with Anne-Marie Cusac in The Progressive, gay rights activist Urvashi Vaid identified The Dialectic of Sex as an influence on her work Virtual Equality (1995).

According to Firestone, Valerie Solanas, author of the SCUM Manifesto, told her that she disliked The Dialectic of Sex.

See also
Postgenderism

Notes

References

 

 
 
 
 
 
 
 

Journals

  

1970 non-fiction books
American non-fiction books
Books by Shulamith Firestone
Debut books
Dialectical materialism
English-language books
Marxist feminism
Radical feminist books
Socialist feminism
William Morrow and Company books